Johannes Riedl (2 January 1950 – 19 August 2010) was a German professional footballer who played as a midfielder. He made 441 appearances in the Bundesliga. He is the father of Thomas Riedl.

Honours
 DFB-Pokal: runner-up 1975–76, 1980–81

References

External links
 

1950 births
2010 deaths
People from Pirmasens
Association football midfielders
German footballers
MSV Duisburg players
Hertha BSC players
1. FC Kaiserslautern players
Arminia Bielefeld players
Kickers Offenbach players
FK Pirmasens players
Bundesliga players
Footballers from Rhineland-Palatinate
20th-century German people
West German footballers